Anthony Patrick Caunter (born 22 September 1937) is a Retired British actor best known for his role as Jack Shepherd in the Yorkshire TV sitcom Queenie's Castle and also his portrayal of Roy Evans in EastEnders from 1994 to 2003.

The second son of Annie Mary and Roy Hobert Caunter, Caunter attended Worthing and Westcliff High Schools, before service in the RAF and training as an actor at LAMDA. Caunter has an older brother, Roger. Caunter's mother died when he was 11 years old. Caunter is married to Frances Wallace and has four children. They live in East Sussex.

His numerous television credits include Crown Court, Z-Cars, The Avengers, London's Burning,  Home to Roost, Queenie's Castle, The Saint, Special Branch, The Champions, Dixon of Dock Green, Catweazle, The Main Chance, The Professionals, The Sweeney, Minder, Pennies From Heaven, Westbeach, Howards' Way, Lovejoy, May to December, Boon, Heartbeat, Juliet Bravo and The Scarlet Pimpernel.  He played Titanic's chief officer Henry Wilde in S.O.S. Titanic. In The Chief, he played Deputy Chief Constable Arthur Quine.
  
He appeared in the Doctor Who stories The Crusade, Colony in Space and Enlightenment, in the same era he also appeared in the BBC's other science fiction show Blake's 7 in the episode Deliverance.

Filmography
 The Ipcress File
 The Hill 
 A Twist of Sand
 The Adding Machine
 The Mind of Mr. Soames
 The Asphyx
 S.O.S. Titanic

References

External links

1937 births
Living people
English male soap opera actors
People educated at Worthing High School